Listen Out is a yearly outdoor music festival held in 4 Australian cities: Sydney, Melbourne, Perth, and Brisbane since 2013. In 2018, an inaugural alternative version of Listen Out, titled 'Listen In' took place in South Australia and New Zealand. The festival is typically held in late September to early October. Listen Out is a one day event attracting both domestic and international Hip-Hop, Indie, and electronic acts. Listen Out consists of three stages; Atari stage, 909 stage and Third base (formerly Red Bull Crate Diggers stage and Young Bloods stage). Listen out has been organised since 2013 by Fuzzy Pty Ltd. Since its inception Listen Out has become popular, attracting over 68,000 attendees during the course of its 2016 tour.



History 
Listen Out's inception occurred after organisers Fuzzy cancelled its other music festival, Parklife to replace it with a new festival that had an emphasis on 'intelligent strains of dance music'.  Listen Out's inaugural tour occurred in 2013, and has been a yearly event since. It consists of three stages, two of which (Atari and 909’s) have identical artist lineups. The Atari stage is the festivals main stage and features the headliners of the festival. The 2013 and 2014 tour allocated only electronic music acts to perform on the Atari stage, with Indie and Hip-hop acts taking place on the 909 stage. In 2015 onward, these roles were changed as Hip-Hop acts now exclusively occurred on the Atari stage and the 909 stage became exclusively electronic music. Unlike these stages, Third base stage is used to showcase local upcoming talent from each state, with different lineups for each leg of the show. In more recent iterations of the event, these lineups now contain acts that tour with the festival over multiple events, however minor tweaks are made to each state's lineup to continue showcasing local talent for each state. From 2013 to 2015 the festival's third stage was sponsored by Red bull titled the ‘crate digger stage’. In 2016 after Fuzzy lost its sponsorship from Red Bull for the event, the stage was sponsored by Universal Store and re-branded the "Young Bloods" stage. In 2017 Fuzzy formerly changed the stage's name to “3rd Base” without the support of any sponsor.

Each year the winners of the annual "Triple J Unearthed" competition for each state make up one act of line up of the Listen Out concert. The winner performs on either the Atari or 909 stage depending on the year. In 2018 Fuzzy brought the addition of a new, smaller edition of Listen Out titled 'Listen in' to reach audiences in South Australia and New Zealand featuring a smaller selection of six acts from the Listen Out version of the tour. In 2019 the South Australian 'Listen in' festival has been announced but the New Zealand leg of the tour is yet to be announced.

Artist Lineup by year

Venues

Controversies 
Listen Out has a history of drug related controversies from the outset. These include:

During the Melbourne leg of the inaugural Listen Out tour, police arrested 13 people in relation to drug related offences. Police were also able to seize $10,000 worth of cocaine, ecstasy and prescription drugs. Further, at the Sydney leg of the same tour 94 were charged by police for drug related offences.

The 2014 version of listen had 37 festival attendees arrested at the Melbourne part of the tour on drug offences.

The Sydney leg of the 2015 tour brought seven people who were arrested due to drug supply, with one carrying over 100 MDMA pills. A further 114 revellers were charged with drug possession at the same show.

In the 2016 run of the Listen Out, during the Victorian leg of the tour a woman aged 27 died of a suspected drug overdose. As a result, the Victorian police allocated more resources to the event for following years such as introducing more passive alert drug detection dogs to be utilised at the following years tour.

Perth's 2017 leg of the tour had nine people charged with drug related offences. The Melbourne leg had 38 people arrested on similar grounds. Sydney's leg also lead to the arrest of 116 people relating to drug offences.

In 2018 following the deaths of two teenagers at the Defqon.1 festival, the NSW government heightened police presence at festivals, as Listen out was the next festival to occur in New South Wales after Defqon.1 all media attention gravitated towards the festival. As a result of the increased police presence, 159 people were charged with drug offences and 5 charged with drug supply. 12 people were taken to hospital at the NSW festival and 7 of these were found to be drug related issues. At the Melbourne leg of the tour in the same year 30 were charged with drug possession and one charged with trafficking cocaine.

Following a successful drug checking trial at Groovin' the Moo earlier in the year the Australian Festival Association suggested to implement this at more festivals as a preventative measure to lessen deaths at music festivals, this was met with a 'no tolerance policy' from New South Wale's premier Gladys Berejiklian. Fuzzy replied to this stance saying governments should be more open to the idea of pill testing in order to create safer festivals.

Notes 
Listen Out official website

Fuzzy official website

References 

Music festivals in Australia